Rinchengang

()
or Renqinggang
() is a town in the Chumbi Valley and the headquarters of the Xia Yadong Township of Yadong County, Tibet region of China. It is in the valley of Amo Chu where the route from Sikkim's Jelep La pass meets Amo Chu. It is also close to the Bhutan–China border (Doklam area), which is currently in dispute. In December 2018, Rinchengang village had a population of around 550 people. The inhabitants are engaged in animal grazing or work as forest rangers. Some also carry supplies to Chinese border troops.

In 2003, the governments of India and China agreed to use Rinchengang as a border trade mart, along with Changgu in Sikkim. It is also the corresponding trade mart  for Sherathang.

Geography 
Rinchengang is in the main Chumbi valley, on the west bank of the Amo Chu river. A stream called Yatung Chu that brings waters from the Jelep La and Nathu La passes on the Sikkim border, joins Amo Chu here. The town has one of the largest tracts of flat land in the Chumbi valley covering around 580 sq km of grasslands and forests.  It is also one of the last villages in the Amo Chu valley before the river enters Bhutan.

Being a spacious location and close to both Sikkim and Bhutan, Rinchengang seems to have always played the role of a trading centre. Archibald Campbell, the Deputy Commissioner of Darjeeling, wrote in 1848 that the people of all three countries, Sikkim, Bhutan and Tibet, traded here.

There was a bridge over Amo Chu at Rinchengang, which provided routes into Bhutan on both the banks of the Amo Chu river: the eastern one going via the Charitang valley towards Haa, and the western one going via the Doklam plateau to Sangbay. (See Map 1) From the Doklam plateau, there was also a route to the Dichu basin (Tendu and Sipchu).

In December 1903 Laurence Waddell passed through Rinchengang on his way to Lhasa and described it as follows:

Rinchengang was prosperous. Being on the route from the Jelep La pass, it participated in the trade between Tibet and the Indian towns Kalimpong and Darjeeling as well as Sikkim's Gangtok. Indian traders were not allowed beyond the Yatung customs house (Old Yatung). So traders from Rinchengang exploited the gap, leading to their prosperity.

There is a Kagyu Monastery on a hill top near Rinchengang, which is said to have been established by Cangba Ada, a monk from the Shangpa Kagyu sect in 1747. According to British traveller John Easton, the hilltop was called Yatung ("nose bridge mountain") and from it was derived the name of Old Yatung in the valley below.
During the Cultural Revolution in China the Kagyu Monastery took some damage. However a restoration was undertaken and many of the cultural relics are preserved.

History

Colonial period 
In the early 1900s, the people of Rinchengang were middlemen traders between central Tibet and the markets in Darjeeling and Calcutta. Ekai Kawaguchi, a Japanese Buddhist monk who travelled in Tibet, chronicled the usage of mules to transport wool from Tomo-Rinchen-gang to Kalenpong. He recorded the fortress of Nyatong (Old Yatung) located close to the grazing grounds of Rinchengang.

After the Younghusband Expedition (1903–1904), the British moved the trade mart to (new) Yatung and also opened the Nathu La pass for travel from Sikkim. Thus, Rinchengang was bypassed and it must have seen reduction in its prospects.

Post-colonial period 

In 1950, the People's Liberation Army moved into Tibet and they established barracks at Richengang. The presence of the Army also meant that the trade through the Chumbi Valley boomed. New roads and communications were established. Sugar, textiles and food items (called rgya zog – Indian goods) went through the Chumbi Valley so much so that the Chumbi Valley was more prosperous than Beijing in the 1950s.

All this came to an end with the Tibetan uprising of 1959. Tensions between India and China increased, and both the countries hampered trade. Following the Sino-India war in 1962, the border crossings at Nathu La and Jelep La were closed. They were not reopened till 2005.

Present 
In 2005 India and China signed a Memorandum of Understanding on border trade with regard to reopening Nathu La. China built anew trade mart at Donqingang on the hilltop near the Kagyu monastery in 2006, and trade between the Chumbi Valley and Sikkim was resumed. In a throwback to the old times, the Indian traders were not allowed to go beyond Donqingang. Rinchengang, 11 km away, was still inaccessible.

Before the construction of Rinchengang as a market, according to a trader from Sikkim, Motilal Lakhotia, "Richengang was just a small settlement with some houses and cultivated fields and something they would just pass by on their tedious journey."

Notes

References

Bibliography 
Secondary sources

 
 
 
 
 
 
 
 
 
Primary sources
 

Populated places in Shigatse
Yadong County